Streeton is a surname. Notable people with the surname include:

 Arthur Streeton (1867–1943), Australian landscape painter
 George H. Streeton (1864–?), American architect
 Richard Streeton (1930–2006), English journalist
 Terence Streeton (1930–2017), British diplomat

See also
 Division of Streeton